Gamma Hydrae (γ Hya, γ Hydrae) is a star in the equatorial constellation of Hydra. It has an apparent visual magnitude of 3.0, placing it second in brightness among the members of this generally faint constellation.

The stellar spectrum matches a stellar classification of G8 III, with the luminosity class of III indicating it has evolved into a giant star after exhausting the supply of hydrogen at its core. It has nearly three times the mass of the Sun and 16 times the Sun's radius. The star is radiating 115 times the Sun's luminosity from its outer atmosphere at an effective temperature of 5,019 K. This heat gives it the yellow glow of a K-type star. Despite having reached an advanced stage in its evolution, it is considerably younger than the Sun with an age of around 372 million years. This is because higher mass stars consume their nuclear fuel at a more rapid rate.

In culture
γ Hya appears on the  flag of Brazil, symbolising the state of Acre.

References 

Hydrae, Gamma
Hydrae, 46
Hydra (constellation)
G-type giants
Suspected variables
5020
115659
064962
Durchmusterung objects